Renato Fabrizio Tapia Cortijo (born 28 July 1995) is a Peruvian professional footballer who plays for La Liga club Celta Vigo and the Peru national team as a defensive midfielder.

Club career

Youth career
Born in Lima, Peru, Tapia started his football career at Sporting Cristal's youth team before joining Esther Grande academy at twelve years old, where he quickly established himself as a youth player. While at the Esther Grande academy, he helped the academy win the Copa Federación with the 1995 category, also winning the Best Player in the 'Night of Stars' awards. His progression at Esther Grande academy attracted interest from Premier League sides Liverpool and Tottenham Hotspur. Tapia revealed that he almost joined Liverpool, but was rejected, due to his height.

Twente
In the summer transfer of 2013, Tapia moved to Europe for the first time in his career, signing a four-year contract with Eredivisie side Twente. Immediately after joining the club, he was sent to the Jong FC Twente, the club's reserves, to develop.

Tapia made his Jong FC Twente debut in a 3–3 draw against De Graafschap on 20 September 2013, coming on as a substitute in the second half for Robbert Schilder. Two weeks later, on 4 October 2013, he was an unused substitute in the first team's match against Cambuur Tapia continued to develop at Jong FC Twente and scored his first goal on 22 November 2013, in a 2–1 win over Willem II. He went on to make 19 appearances, scoring once for Twente's reserves in the 2013–14 season.

Following a season at Jong FC Twente, Tapia was promoted to the first team at Twente. He made his first-team debut at Twente in the opening game of the season, a 0–0 draw against Cambuur, coming on as a substitute in the 80th minute for Darryl Lachman. A week later he suffered an ankle injury that kept him out for three months. He made his return to the first team as a late substitute in a 2–1 win over PEC Zwolle on 23 November 2014. In a match against Willem II on 21 December 2014, Tapia was sent-off, just 8 minutes after coming on as a substitute, for a foul on Samuel Armenteros. Following a one match suspension, he scored his first goal for the club on 31 January 2015, in a 2–1 win over Cambuur. He later scored four more goals later in the season against PEC Zwolle, Groningen and a brace against Go Ahead Eagles. His season ended when he suffered a knee injury and finished the season making 22 appearances and scoring five times in all competitions.

Shortly after the end of the 2014–15 season, Tapia underwent surgery on his knee and it was expected that he would be sidelined for the start of the 2015–16 season, costing his place in the Perú squad for the 2015 Copa América. But in mid-July, he made a recovery from a knee injury after training with the first team. He then scored in the opening game of the season, in a 1–1 draw against Groningen. He again suffered a knee injury and was substituted in the second half as a result. Having recovered he appeared in a number of appearance, playing the first five matches of the season, before suffering a knee injury against Ajax on 12 September 2015. He suffered a knee injury in early November and missed one Twente match, but recovered in time for his international duty. By the end of the first half of the season, Tapia had made 14 appearances and scored once in all competitions.

Feyenoord
In December 2015, Feyenoord confirmed their interest in signing Tapia after learning about FC Twente's financial situation and he was reported among three players at Twente to be sold. The transfer was finalised on 27 January 2016, for a reported transfer fee of €2.4 million. After three years at FC Twente, Tapia signed a 4.5-year contract with Feyenoord.

Tapia made his Feyenoord debut in a rivalry match against Ajax on 7 February 2016, starting in a 2–1 loss. His first team opportunities was restricted to three appearances and being an unused substitute. Instead, he played in the reserve for most of the season. He later stated that in order to earn a first team chance, he needed to improve by acting faster and simpler to suit the club's tactics.

Ahead of the 2016–17 season, Tapia hoped he could establish himself in the first team. He continued to be in the substitutes. On 22 September 2016, he made his first appearance in the second round of KNVB Cup, playing 7 minutes after coming on as a substitute in a 4–1 win over Oss. On 2 October 2016, he scored in his first league appearance of the season, just 13 minutes after coming on as a substitute, in a 2–0 win over Willem II.

Celta de Vigo
On 20 July 2020, La Liga side Celta de Vigo announced the free signing of Tapia under a four-year contract.

International career
Tapia was selected by the Peru U17 for the South American Under-17 Football Championship and by the Peru U20 for the South American Youth Football Championship.

In March 2015, Tapia was called up by the Peru's senior team for the first time. He made his debut on 1 April 2015, in a 2–2 draw against Venezuela. He was expected to be in the Copa América for the Peru squad, but an injury prevented him from doing so. Despite this, he was included in the squad for the Copa América Centenario and played all of the four matches in the campaign. Tapia scored his first Peru goal on 7 September 2016, in a 2–1 win over Ecuador.

In May 2018, he was named in Peru's provisional 24 man squad for the 2018 World Cup in Russia.

Personal life
Tapia is of African and Quechua origin and alongside teammate Edison Flores, campaigned to promote and protect the Quechua people during the 2018 FIFA World Cup.

Career statistics

Club

International

International goals
Scores and results list Peru's goal tally first.

Honours
Feyenoord
 Eredivisie: 2016–17
 KNVB Cup: 2015–16, 2017–18
Johan Cruijff Shield: 2017, 2018

References

External links
 
 
 

1995 births
Living people
Footballers from Lima
Peruvian footballers
Peruvian expatriate footballers
Association football defenders
Eredivisie players
La Liga players
FC Twente players
Feyenoord players
Willem II (football club) players
RC Celta de Vigo players
Expatriate footballers in the Netherlands
Expatriate footballers in Spain
Peruvian expatriate sportspeople in the Netherlands
Peru under-20 international footballers
Peru international footballers
Copa América Centenario players
2018 FIFA World Cup players
2019 Copa América players
2021 Copa América players
Peruvian people of African descent
Peruvian people of Quechua descent
Peruvian expatriate sportspeople in Spain
Jong FC Twente players